Comamonas kerstersii is a Gram-negative, oxidase- and catalase-positive,  motile bacterium with multitrichous polar flagella from the genus Comamonas and family  Comamonadaceae. C. kerstersii is a subgroup of Comamonas terrigena, and has been linked to cases of perforated appendices.

References

External links
Type strain of Comamonas kerstersii at BacDive -  the Bacterial Diversity Metadatabase

Comamonadaceae
Bacteria described in 2003